Oceanisphaera sediminis is a Gram-negative, aerobic and motile bacterium from the genus of Oceanisphaera which has been isolated from marine sediments from the coast of Korea.

References 

Aeromonadales
Bacteria described in 2012